Ragged Ass Road is the third solo studio album by Red Rider frontman Tom Cochrane, released in October 1995. The album was named for Ragged Ass Road, a street in Yellowknife, Northwest Territories.  Songs from the album include "I Wish You Well", which became the first Canadian song to debut at #1 on the RPM Canadian Singles Charts, as well as three other Top 20 hits in Canada: "Wildest Dreams" ( RPM Canadian Charts), "Dreamer's Dream" ( RPM Canadian Charts) and "Crawl" ( RPM Canadian Charts). Ragged Ass Road earned two Juno award nominations and achieved Platinum sales status in Canada. The album was produced by Cochrane and John Webster at Metalworks Studios and Ragged Ass Road Studios.

Track listing

Personnel
 Tom Cochrane 	 - guitars, harmonica, mandolin, vocals
 John Webster - keyboards, engineer
 Ken "Spider" Sinnaeve	 - bass
 Alex Lifeson	 - guitar
 Bill Bell		 - guitars (acoustic & electric)
 Annette Ducharme	 - guitar (acoustic), backing vocals
 Dick Smith		 - percussion
 Gregor Beresford	 - percussion, drums
 Evanne Cochrane	 - vocals
 Molly Johnson      - backing vocals
 Saffron Henderson	 - backing vocals

References

1995 albums
Tom Cochrane albums
Capitol Records albums
Albums recorded at Metalworks Studios